Toolroom Knights, Vol. 2 is the second release of Toolroom Records mixed by Gabriel & Dresden.

This compilation includes the collaboration of many artists. It includes the Remix of The Killers Read My Mind and the hit by D. Ramirez & Mark Knight Colombian Soul.

Toolroom Knights, Vol. 2 (Mixed By Gabriel & Dresden) 
CD 1
Intro 
Junior Boys - In The Morning (Hot Chip Remix)
Above & Beyond - Good For Me (King Roc Dub Mix)
Claude VonStroke - Who's Afraid Of Detroit?
The Knife - Like A Pen (Thomas Schumacher Remix)
D. Ramirez & Mark Knight - Colombian Soul (Gabriel & Dresden Reconstruction)
Stephan Bodzin - Fahrenheit
The Egg - Nothing (Dusty Kid Loves Rock Mix)
Josh Gabriel - Crosstalk
Özgür Can - 84 Shots
Gabriel & Dresden Feat. Molly Bancroft - Tracking Treasure Down (Wippenberg 128 Mix)
Merkins - Nesk
Trentemoller - Moan (Trentemoller Remix)

CD 2
Intro
Monochrome - Pearl (Gabriel & Dresden Thirst Remix)
Shlomi Aber & Itamar Sagi - Blonda
Eyerer & Namito - Quipa (Etienne De Crecy Remix)
James Holden vs Christopher Norman Feat. 3pm - A Break In The Clouds / Turn On The Lights (Acappella) 
Gabriel & Dresden & Scarlett Etienne - Eleven 
Dubfire - Roadkill
Gabriel & Dresden Feat. Jan Burton - Enemy (Gabriel & Dresden 2007 Remix)
Dusty Kid - Tsunamy
The Killers - Read My Mind (Gabriel & Dresden Mix)
Josh Gabriel - Summit
68 Beats - Replay The Night (Gabriel & Dresden Remix)
Mark Knight & Dave Spoon - Sylo
Apparat - Fractales, Pt. 1

Gabriel & Dresden albums
2007 remix albums